Armand LaMontagne (born 1939) is an American sculptor of celebrated personalities.

Education
LaMontagne is a graduate of Worcester Academy and Boston College. He is a self-taught artist who has honed his skills through practicing his profession.

Body of work
He is best recognized for his realistic, life-size wood and bronze sculptures. Lamontagne has long focused on New England sporting legends as subjects of his work including Ted Williams, Larry Bird, Bobby Orr, Carl Yastrzemski, and Harry Agganis. Writer Saul Wisnia described Lamontagne's wood sculpture in Sports Illustrated "With hair, clothes and shoes all carved from single 1,800-to-2,500-pound blocks of basswood, LaMontagne's works often leave viewers staring in disbelief at what appears to be real skin, wool and leather. Sometimes amazement gives way to emotion; upon seeing his statue in 1985, the notoriously rough-edged Williams broke down and cried." His works are on permanent display in the collections of The Baseball Hall of Fame, Cooperstown, New York; the New England Sports Museum, Boston, Massachusetts; the Patton Museum of Cavalry and Armor, Fort Knox, Kentucky; and the Basketball Hall of Fame, Springfield, Massachusetts.

LaMontagne's talents were brought to the national spotlight in the 1970s when he deliberately made a reproduction of a 17th-century turned oak Brewster Chair (an iconic Pilgrim chair) to embarrass the "experts". LaMontagne even soaked the chair in salt water to simulate aging.  LaMontagne then gave the chair away.  Eventually, the Henry Ford Museum purchased the "fake" from a dealer for $9,000. The museum was later notified of their error, when LaMontagne published an admission in the Providence Journal.

LaMontagne handbuilt a large crucifix of Jesus which is located on the back-wall of the sanctuary of Saint Joseph Roman Catholic Church in Scituate, Rhode Island.

LaMontagne has also handbuilt a replica 17th-century Rhode Island house called a stone-ender in Scituate, Rhode Island.

References

External links
Institute for International Sport bio
LaMontagne's Brewster Chair Fake

American woodcarvers
Worcester Academy alumni
Boston College
1939 births
Living people